Taradell is a municipality in the Osona (comarca) of the Province of Barcelona.

History 
The town has been documented since the 10th century.

References

External links

 Government data pages 

Municipalities in Osona